Baneh is a city and capital of Baneh County, Kurdistan Province, in Iran's western border. Baneh is bordered by Saqqez to the east, Marivan to the south, Sardasht to the west, and is approximately 30 km (18 miles) from Kurdistan Region in Iraq. According to the 2016 census, the city has a population of 115,325. After the cities of Sanandaj, Marivan and Saqqez.

History 
Historically, Baneh had a strategic and political importance due to its close proximity to the Ottoman Empire. The city was part of the three Kurdish principalities; Ardalan, Baban and Mokryan.

The old city had two citadels and was generally ruled by the Eḵtīār-al-Dīn family who held both religious and secular power of the city. The family was held in high steem during the Safavid era and received the title 'sultan'. Moreover, rulers of Baneh had the responsibility of protecting the whole area from Khoy to Kermanshah. In the 16th century, Mīrzā Beg b. Mīr Moḥammad became the first virtually independent ruler of Baneh and its surroundings.

During the 18th and 19th centuries, the city was plagued with epidemics which killed a large portion of the population. In 1944, the city experienced turmoil as part of the Hama Rashid revolt and was also bombed by both parties during the Iran–Iraq War in the 1980s. Most locals fled to Iraq during the war and much of the region was destroyed.

Demographics 
The population is mostly Shafiʽi Kurdish who speak Sorani.

People 
 Ebrahim Younesi, writer and translator
 Bahman Ghobadi, director and writer
 Ata Nahaei, novelist and translator
 Ebrahim Alipour, photographer
 Keywan Karimi, director

Gallery

References

Towns and villages in Baneh County
Cities in Kurdistan Province
Iranian Kurdistan
Kurdish settlements in Kurdistan Province